The 37th AVN Awards was a pornography award show recognizing the best actresses, actors, directors and films in the adult industry in 2019. Nominations were announced at a ceremony on November 24, 2019 at the Avalon Hollywood. The show was held on January 25, 2020 at the Hard Rock Hotel and Casino in Las Vegas. It was broadcast on Showtime. The awards show was hosted by adult star Nikki Benz, MyFreeCams celebrity Emily Bloom, with comedian Aries Spears. The 37th AVN Awards was noteworthy as one of the last events held at the Hard Rock Hotel and Casino in Las Vegas, before the facility's closure on February 3, 2020.

Musical guests featured Beyond Glascow, Doja Cat and DJ Diplo. Doja Cat performed songs off her album Hot Pink, including "Juicy". DJ Diplo featured musician Lil Pump performing his Kanye West collaboration, "I Love It". Actress Angela White won Female Performer of the Year; she became the first actress in history to win the award three times in a row. Maitland Ward, a mainstream actress-turned pornographic actress previously known from Boy Meets World and The Bold and the Beautiful, was recognized with multiple awards after first debuting in the adult industry in 2019. The 2020 awards was the first time a film from Greece received a nomination for Best Foreign Production.

Show overview 
The event was held inside the Hard Rock Hotel and Casino in Las Vegas at the music venue called The Joint. The 37th AVN Awards was presented by MyFreeCams. Referred to in the media as "the Oscars of porn", the event honors excellence in the adult industry. Las Vegas has hosted the event since 1998. The AVN Awards draws 50,000 to the annual show and surrounding events. In the week leading up to the ceremony, it was preceded by the GayVN Awards, and a trade show. The Hard Rock Hotel and Casino closed on February 3, 2020, to be replaced by the Virgin Hotels Las Vegas. The AVN Awards signed a contract with Virgin Hotels Las Vegas through the year 2023 to continue the event at the new location. The Daily Beast observed of the fact that the 37th AVN Awards was one of the last events held in the establishment, "There is no more fitting end for the rock and roll-themed hotel than the festival of debauchery that is AVN Awards week, a four-day adult entertainment convention that ends with the racy 'Oscars of Porn.'" Parties coinciding with the 37th AVN Awards included the Lair Fetish Party the day before, and the AVN Awards After Party the night of the event at the Vanity Night Club.

Presenters 
Presenting the 37th AVN Awards were Emily Bloom and adult star Nikki Benz. Emily Bloom was known from MyFreeCams, and garnered the award for Favorite Cam Girl. Comedian Aries Spears, who previously co-hosted the 35th AVN Awards in 2018, returned to co-host. The awards event was managed by executive producers AVN chief executive officer Tony Rios along with Gary Miller. Benz and Bloom reprised their roles for a May 2020 live stream of the event; they were joined for the live stream by adult film stars [Small Hands, Penny Pax, Vicki Chase, Violet Doll, Maitland Ward, Joanna Angel, Gianna Dior, and Angela White. The live stream event was held on AVN Stars — a social media site started in January 2020 at the AVN Adult Entertainment Expo. AVN Awards executive producer Gary Miller posed questions to the celebrities during the 90-minute live stream event.

Performers 
Musical performances by rapper Doja Cat and DJ Diplo occurred throughout the show. Doja Cat commented to AllHipHop, "I’m honored and excited to be the second woman ever to perform at the AVN Awards." Journalist Rosario Harper noted for SOHH that Doja Cat was following in the footsteps of Kanye West and Cardi B following a trend of hip hop music stars headlining at the AVN Awards. Layla Halabian reviewed Doja Cat's fashion choice favorably for Nylon, "In her latest move, the rapper performed at the 2020 AVN Adult Entertainment Awards in Las Vegas on January 25 in a truly unforgettable nude mesh bodysuit, complete with rhinestone silhouettes highlighting her nipples, butt, and that most maligned of body hair — pubes." Doja Cat performed songs from her 2019 album Hot Pink, including "Juicy", and "Cyber Sex".

DJ Diplo featured musician Lil Pump in his performance. Lil Pump performed from his collaboration with Kanye West, titled, "I Love It". Jed Gregorio of the Inquirer commented favorably of Diplo's outfit at the event, "Thomas Wesley a.k.a Diplo attended 'the only award show that matters this weekend' wearing probably the only outfit that, in fact, mattered this weekend." Gregorio observed, "The event is question is the 2020 Adult Video News Awards in Las Vegas, where the DJ performed wearing a baby pink cowboy hat, a baby pink suit, and brown suede boots. The fit, fabricated by Union Western Clothing, features some delicious iconography, including a guy getting it on with a mermaid, some minotaur action, and anthropomorphic mushrooms." Union Western Clothing worked with Diplo in advance of the AVN Awards specifically to craft an outfit for the event itself.

Winners and nominees

Major awards 

Angela White won the night's main award, for Female Performer of the Year, becoming the first person ever to win this trophy three times in a row. Writing for The Daily Beast columnist Aurora Snow commented of her achievement, "she became the first woman ever to win three consecutive years; an unusual accolade for any female performer to receive".

Maitland Ward, a mainstream actress-turned pornographic actress who previously starred as Rachel McGuire on the sitcom Boy Meets World and Jessica Forrester on the soap opera The Bold and the Beautiful, was recognized with multiple awards at the ceremony. Ward first debuted in the adult film industry in 2019 and became the brand ambassador of the adult content creator Deeper. Ward had a starring role in the adult production Drive directed by Kayden Kross. Drive was Ward's first feature film role in the adult industry. Ward took honors for Best Supporting Actress, Best Three-Way Sex Scene, and Favorite Camming Cosplayer. She frequently attends comic book conventions and participates in cosplay. Kayden Cross took Best Director - Dramatic Production for Drive, as well as Director of the Year after a prior win in the same category the year before.

The 37th AVN Awards was the first time a film from Greece was recognized with a nomination for Best Foreign Production. Adult film industry director Dimitris Sirinakis, commonly known within the industry as the Greek King of Porn, and his production company Sirina Productions received the nomination. Sirinakis was nominated for his film, Filthy Rich Games.

Natalie Mars received the award for Transgender Performer of the Year. Additionally, the film starring Mars, Transfixed: Natalie Mars Showcase, won the award for Best Transgender Production. Mars was also voted Favorite Trans Cam Star and Favorite Trans Porn Star. Mars joined the adult industry four and a half years prior, and had previously received nominations for Performer of the Year in the three previous AVN Awards.

Axel Braun, a prior inductee to the AVN Hall of Fame, garnered the award for Best Parody for his film in the Wicked Comix series, Captain Marvel XXX: An Axel Braun Parody. This was his tenth win in the category in a row. The same film also won awards for Best Special Effects and Best Makeup for Dusty Lynn, Best Soundtrack, and Best Transgender One-on-One Sex Scene for Kenzie Taylor and Aubrey Kate.

Bold indicates winner.

General References:

Additional award winners

AVN Award [Winner]

Hall of Fame inductees 
AVN on January 14, 2020, announced the 2019 inductees into its hall of fame, who were later honored with a January 22 cocktail party and then a video as the awards show opened.

 Video Branch: Bill Bailey, Angel Dark, Kianna Dior, Nicki Hunter, Jelena Jensen, Karla Lane, Sunny Lane, Marcus London, Brandi Love, L.T., Gianna Michaels, Tony Montana, Laurent Sky, Rob Spallone, Charlotte Stokely
 Executive Branch: Farrell Hirsch, Glenn King, Dave Peskin, Andy Wullmer
 Founders Branch: Rubin "Ruby" Gottesman

2020 AVN Adult Entertainment Expo 
The 2020 AVN Adult Entertainment Expo was held prior to the award show from January 22 to January 25, 2020. The AVN Awards and Expo featured over 1,000 stars from the adult entertainment sector. The Expo itself contained more than 400 exhibitors at the convention. The convention featured a musical performance by rapper and songwriter T-Pain. L.A. Weekly noted it was the "largest porn industry gathering of its kind in the United States, featuring four days of events, panels and meetups, merch and memorabilia".

The convention also featured lectures on topics related to the adult film industry. Lawyer D. Gill Sperlein presented in an AVN seminar on the litigation implications related to producing pornographic content. Sperlein commented, "I think it's unlikely that there would be a conviction for obscenity." Sperlein observed regardless of legal merit, prosecutions were frequently sought against producers of adult film content,  and were "done for political gain". Sperlein asserted of prosecutors of such litigation, "they don't care if they get a conviction or not." Decriminalize Sex Work organization staff member Kaytlin Bailey had a booth at the event to raise awareness to her cause; she stated the reaction to her issues was positive at the event, and discussed the stigma facing sex workers. The Free Speech Coalition and the Adult Performer Advocacy Committee handed out literature at the event supporting sex workers' rights. Sex educator  and author Carol Queen attended the Expo, and presented a seminar on sex and technology impacting the industry. She commented regarding changing stigmas in society related to sex education and feminism.

See also
2020 in film
2020 in television
92nd Academy Awards
72nd Primetime Emmy Awards
2020 British Academy Television Awards

References

Further reading

External links
 

AVN Awards
Hard Rock Hotel and Casino (Las Vegas)
2019 film awards
2020 awards in the United States
2020 in Nevada
January 2020 events in the United States